Veronica is a Dutch free-to-cable commercial television channel currently a part of Talpa TV (Talpa Network). The channel was launched as TV10 Gold on 1 May 1995, then became TV10, Fox, Fox 8 and V8, before becoming Veronica on 20 September 2003. The channel is dedicated to young adults and the male audience.

Veronica is time-sharing with Disney XD: Disney XD broadcasts on daytime and Veronica on night time, the practice began when Saban International bought TV10 in January 1997, and launched a Fox Kids slot on the channel.

It is not to be confused with the Veronica Association.

History

TV10 Gold and TV10 (1995-1998)
In 1995, Dutch media company Arcade launched two television channels in the Netherlands: The Music Factory, a competing music channel for MTV, and TV10 Gold which launched on 1 May 1995. TV10 Gold's programming focused on reruns of classic TV series such as Dynasty, Fantasy Island, James Herriot, Hill Street Blues, Are You Being Served?, The Monkees, The Onedin Line, Sanford and Son, Bergerac and Colditz.

In 1996, TV10 Gold became part of the second largest Dutch media corporation Wegener Arcade. On 1 January 1996, Arcade merged with publishing company Wegener. In the first quarter of 1996, TV10 Gold changed into just TV10 to modernize its image. British sitcoms such as 'Allo 'Allo! and You Rang, M'Lord? remained part of the programming, along with the American TV series M*A*S*H.

In January 1997, Saban International bought TV10 and partnered with Holland Media Groep. Fox/Saban's Fox Kids was introduced in the Netherlands, time-sharing with TV10. Within the year, the partnership ended and Holland Media Groep's shares of TV10 were bought by Fox.

Fox and Fox 8 (1998-2001)
On 19 December 1998, TV10 was rebranded into Fox. Rupert Murdoch's Fox International Channels wanted to expand in Europe and through its cooperation with Saban it could make its first try-outs in the Netherlands with TV10. Popular TV series such as Sex and the City, Dawson's Creek, Malcolm in the Middle and Charmed premiered on the channel. Fox became Fox 8 in September 1999, but it rebranded back to Fox in September 2000. However, Fox could not get rid of TV10's image as an old-fashioned rerun channel.

In 2001, SBS Broadcasting B.V., then the Dutch branch of the SBS Broadcasting Group, bought the channel from the News Corporation.

21st Century Fox (the legal successor of the original News Corporation) later launched the second incarnation of Fox on 19 August 2013 through Eredivisie Media & Marketing CV, in which Fox Networks Group Benelux has a 51% share.

V8 (2001-2003)

SBS, having bought the channel from News Corporation, renamed it into V8 on 1 May 2001 in anticipation of Veronica. Earlier in 2000 Veronica Association announced that it would leave the Holland Media Groep and wanted to start a channel of its own. SBS and Veronica could not get an agreement and it would take more than two years before both parties closed a deal.

V8 was focused to young adults. The channel mainly broadcast action series, action films and erotic programmes late at night.

Veronica (2003-present)
Eventually, Veronica Association closed a deal with SBS, and V8 was rebranded as Veronica on 20 September 2003.

The German ProSiebenSat.1 Media took over SBS Broadcasting Group (including its Dutch activities) on 27 June 2007. In 2011, all of SBS's activities in the Netherlands (through SBS Broadcasting B.V.), including the three TV stations (SBS6, Net5 and Veronica), the two TV guides (Veronica Magazine and Totaal TV), production, design and text activities were sold to a joint venture between Sanoma Media Netherlands (67%) and Talpa Media Holding (33%).

On 10 April 2017 Talpa Holding acquired a 67% stake from Sanoma Media Netherlands.

Disney XD

The daytime slot for children broadcast on Veronica began as Fox Kids when Saban bought TV10. The slot since rebranded to Jetix and then to Disney XD.

Programming
$h*! My Dad Says
10-8: Officers on Duty
2 Broke Girls
2 Nuts and a Richard!
3rd Rock from the Sun
60 Days In
ALF
According to Jim
Agents of S.H.I.E.L.D.
Airport 24/7: Miami
Airwolf
Alan Sugar: The Apprentice
Alias
American Ninja Warrior
American Housewife
Archer
American Dad!
Axe Cop
American Pickers
Angel
Anger Management
Animal Airport
Are You Hot?
Arrow
Baby Daddy
Barter Kings
Battlestar Galactica
Baywatch
Baywatch Nights
Better with You
Beverly Hills, 90210
Big Brother
Blade
Blindspot
Bob's Burgers
Booze Britain
Border Patrol
Border Security
Border Security: America's Front Line
Border Security: Canada's Front Line
Brainiac: Science Abuse
Buffy the Vampire Slayer
Campus PD
Chase
Chicago Med
City Homicide
Crash Canyon
Criminal Minds
Criminal Minds: Beyond Borders
Criminal Minds: Suspect Behavior
Dark Blue
Day Break
Dynasty
Eureka
Everybody Hates Chris
Family Ties
Family Guy
Fastlane
FBI
Fear Factor
FlashForward
Flashpoint
Frasier
FreakyLinks
Friends
Fugget About It
Full House
Futurama
Gary Unmarried
George Lopez
Gotham
Grandfathered
Growing Pains
Happy Days
Hardcore Pawn
Hawaii Five-0
Hercules: The Legendary Journeys
Home Improvement
Human Target
I Am Weasel
Invasion
It Only Hurts When I Laugh
iZombie
JAG
Jericho
Joey
Kevin Can Wait
Killer Instinct
King of the Hill
Knuckleheads
Las Vegas
Law & Order: Special Victims Unit
Lethal Weapon
Lizard Lick Towing
Life's a Zoo
Lois & Clark: The New Adventures of Superman
Lost
MacGyver (1985 TV series)
MacGyver (2016 TV series)
Magnum, P.I.
Malcolm in the Middle
Man with a Plan
Married... with Children
Medical Investigation
Melrose Place
Men Behaving Badly
Merlin
Miami Vice
Mike & Molly
Miss Match
Mom
Moonlighting
Moral Orel
My Wife and Kids
NCIS
NCIS: Los Angeles
Nikita
Nikki
Nip/Tuck
Numbers
Off Centre
Pawn Stars
Person of Interest
Poker After Dark
Profiler
Pussycat Dolls Present: Girlicious
Pussycat Dolls Present: The Search for the Next Doll
Retired at 35
Revolution
Richard Hammond's Crash Course
Rick and Morty
Rick and Steve
Ricki Lake
RoboCop: The Series
Robot Chicken
Rome
Roswell
Rules of Engagement
Saved by the Bell
Scare Tactics
Scorpion
Scrubs
Seinfeld
Sliders
Smallville
Solar Opposites
South Park
Spin City
Stalker
Star Trek: Deep Space Nine
Star Trek: Enterprise
Star Trek: The Next Generation
Star Trek: The Original Series
Star Trek: Voyager
Stargate Atlantis
Stargate SG-1
Starsky and Hutch
Step by Step
Still Standing
Storage Wars
Storage Wars: New York
Storage Wars: Texas
Supernatural
Surface
S.W.A.T.
Sweet Valley High
Temptation Island
Terminator: The Sarah Connor Chronicles
That '70s Show
The Angry Beavers
The Big Bang Theory
The Border
The Buried Life
The Carbonaro Effect
The Dating Guy
The Drew Carey Show
The Dukes of Hazzard
The Embassy
The Evidence
The Exes
The Following
The Fresh Prince of Bel-Air
The Inbetweeners
The Invisible Man
The Jamie Kennedy Experiment
The Kill Point
The King of Queens
The Last Ship
The Librarians
The Millers
The Muppets
The O.C.
The Ren & Stimpy Show
The Sentinel
The Shield
The Simpsons
The X-Files
Threat Matrix
Threshold
Tim and Eric Awesome Show, Great Job!
Titus
Top Gear
Top Gear Australia
Tour of Duty
Traveler
Trouble in Paradise
True Justice
Two Guys and a Girl
Two and a Half Men
Undateable
Underbelly
Undercover Boss
Unhappily Ever After
Wanted
Will & Grace
Xena: Warrior Princess

Sports programming
The Ocean Race
UEFA Champions League
UEFA Europa League

References

External links
 

1995 establishments in the Netherlands
Television channels in the Netherlands
Television channels and stations established in 1976
Mass media in Amsterdam
Talpa Network
Former News Corporation subsidiaries